is a Japanese animation studio that animates and produces anime television series and films.

The company's name, "VOLN", is an acronym for "Visiting Old Learn New".

Establishment
The studio was founded on August 12, 2014, by ex-Madhouse producer and director Keiji Mita, who currently heads the company as its president and representative. The studio's first two animated series were co-productions with MAPPA, including an adaptation of the popular manga series Ushio & Tora. Since then, it started to produce its own works, including a theatrical anime film version of the 2015 novel I Want to Eat Your Pancreas. Animator Abiru Takahiko was one of the studio's animation directors for a time.

Works
The list below is a list of Studio VOLN's works as a lead animation studio.

Anime television series

Films

References

External links
Official website 

Japanese animation studios
Japanese companies established in 2014
Animation studios in Tokyo
Mass media companies established in 2014
Suginami